Jujubinus polychromus is a species of sea snail, a marine gastropod mollusk in the family Trochidae, the top snails.

Distribution
This marine species is endemic to Southwest Australia

References

 Thiele, J. (1930): Gastropoda und Bivalvia. - In: Die Fauna Südwest-Australiens. Ergebnisse der Hamburger südwest-asutralischen Forschungsreise 1905 (Michaelsen, W. & Hartmeyer, R. ed.), vol. 5, No. 8, pp. 561–596
 Dekker H. (2006). Description of a new species of Kanekotrochus (Gastropoda: Trochidae) from Vietnam. Miscellanea Malacologia, 2(1): 1–4

External links

polychromus
Gastropods of Australia
Gastropods described in 1930